Petrophora subaequaria, the northern petrophora, is a species of geometrid moth in the family Geometridae. It was described by Francis Walker in 1860 and is found in North America.

The MONA or Hodges number for Petrophora subaequaria is 6804.

References

 Ferris C. (2010). "A revision of the genus Antepione Packard with description of the new genus Pionenta Ferris (Lepidoptera, Geometridae, Ennominae)". ZooKeys. 71: 49-70.
 Scoble, Malcolm J. ed. (1999). Geometrid Moths of the World: A Catalogue (Lepidoptera, Geometridae). 1016.

Further reading

 Arnett, Ross H. (2000). American Insects: A Handbook of the Insects of America North of Mexico. CRC Press.

Lithinini